This list is of the Historic Sites of Japan located within the Prefecture of Chiba.

National Historic Sites
As of 1 July 2021, thirty-one Sites have been designated as being of national significance (including one *Special Historic Site).

| align="center"|Torikakenishi Shell MoundTorikakenishi kaizuka || Funabashi || || ||  || || 
|-
|}

Prefectural Historic Sites
As of 1 May 2020, eighty Sites have been designated as being of prefectural importance.

Municipal Historic Sites
As of 1 May 2020, a further three hundred and eighty-eight Sites have been designated as being of municipal importance.

See also

 Cultural Properties of Japan
 Shimōsa Province
 Kazusa Province
 Awa Province
 National Museum of Japanese History
 List of Places of Scenic Beauty of Japan (Chiba)

References

External links
  Cultural Properties in Chiba Prefecture

Chiba Prefecture
 Chiba